Scotland national youth football team can refer to the following age group teams:

 Scotland national under-21 football team
 Scotland national under-20 football team
 Scotland national under-19 football team
 Scotland national under-18 football team
 Scotland national under-17 football team
 Scotland national under-16 football team

Scotland national football team